Sederholm is a surname. Notable people with the surname include:

 Emelie Sederholm (born 1994), Finnish singer-songwriter
 Jakob Sederholm (1863–1934), Finnish geologist
 Jess Richards, born Richard Sederholm (died 1994), American actor
 Katarina Sederholm (born 1968), Finnish-Norwegian athlete
 Lars Sederholm, Swedish-British equestrian trainer